The Gascoyne River is a river in the Gascoyne region of Western Australia. At , it is the longest river in Western Australia.

Description
The Gascoyne River comprises three branches in its upper reaches. The Gascoyne River (South Branch) rises near the 
The Gascoyne flows generally west by southwest and is joined by 36 tributaries including the Lyons River, Landor River, Thomas River, and numerous other creeks and gullies. The river descends  over its  course.

It is said to be an upside-down river, as it flows for about 120 days of the year and below the dry river bed for the remainder of the year. It is in effect a huge water storage system with the river's aquifers lying below the desert sands.

It flows through sparsely vegetated countryside which is used mainly for gold-mining and sheep stations. The river flows through many permanent pools that are valuable to both stock and native species. Some of the main pools located along the river include Tibbingoona Pool, Mutherbokin Pool and Mibbley Pool.

History
The Gascoyne River has been known to Aboriginal peoples for thousands of years.

The river was first seen by Europeans on 4 March 1839 by the explorer Lieutenant George Grey, who named it after a friend, Captain John Gascoyne RN, son of Bamber Gascoyne, a Lord Commissioner of the Admiralty. Captain Gascoyne was a committee member of the London-based Western Australian Missionary Society and a member of the London Association for the Protection of the Interests  of the Colony.

The area had three dry years from mid 1909 to early 1913 with the Gascoyne River not running for any of that time. Carnarvon had water supply issues as a result of the lack of flow.

Floods
The most severe flooding of the Gascoyne River occurred in December 2010. Triggered by record-breaking rainfall, amounting to over 6,000 percent of the monthly mean,  and  respectively, in just four days, the floods caused widespread damage in the region. Water levels reached record values at three stations along the river, cresting at  near Fishy Pool. Evacuation orders were issued for several towns affected by rising waters. The most substantial impact was felt in Carnarvon where entire homes were washed away. Following the disaster, emergency supplies and funds were distributed to affected residents to aid them in restoring their livelihoods. Though no people died in the event, an estimated two thousand head of cattle perished and damage was estimated at 100 million.  The size of the flood, and the region it affected has also created serious issues for the region.

In March 2015 Cyclone Olwyn affected the Gascoyne River and caused flooding, the most severe since the 2010 flood.

Gallery

See also

List of watercourses in Western Australia

References 

Rivers of the Gascoyne region